Lebedodes is a genus of moths in the family Cossidae.

Species
 Lebedodes bassa (Bethune-Baker, 1908)
 Lebedodes castanea Janse, 1925
 Lebedodes clathratus Grünberg, 1911
 Lebedodes cossula Holland, 1893
 Lebedodes endomela Bethune-Baker, 1909
 Lebedodes fraterna Gaede, 1929
 Lebedodes ianrobertsoni Lehmann, 2009
 Lebedodes jeanneli Le Cerf, 1914 
 Lebedodes johni Lehmann, 2008 
 Lebedodes leifaarviki Lehmann, 2009 
 Lebedodes naevius Fawcett, 1916
 Lebedodes reticulata Gaede, 1929
 Lebedodes rufithorax Hampson, 1910
 Lebedodes schaeferi Grünberg, 1911
 Lebedodes velutina Le Cerf, 1914
 Lebedodes violascens Gaede, 1929
 Lebedodes wichgrafi Grünberg, 1910
 Lebedodes willihaberlandi Lehmann, 2008

Former species
 Lebedodes fumealis Janse
 Lebedodes hintzi Grünberg, 1911
 Lebedodes natalica Hampson, 1910

References

 , 2008: Ten new species of Metarbelidae (Lepidoptera: Cossoidea) from the coastal forests and the Eastern Arc Mountains Of Kenya and Tanzania, including one species From Two Upland Forests. Journal of East African Natural History 97 (1): 43-82. . Abstract: .
 , 2008: Six New Species of Metarbelidae (Lepidoptera: Cossoidea) from the Eastern Arc Mountains of Tanzania, Including One New Species from Marenji Forest in Southeast Coastal Kenya. Journal of East African Natural History 97 (2): 187-206. . Abstract: .

External links
Natural History Museum Lepidoptera generic names catalog

Metarbelinae